The Protocol Against the Illicit Manufacturing and Trafficking in Firearms, Their Parts and Components and Ammunition (Firearms Protocol) is a treaty on anti-arms trafficking including Small Arms and Light Weapons that is supplemental to the Convention against Transnational Organized Crime. It is one of the so-called Palermo protocols.

The Protocol was adopted by the United Nations General Assembly as Resolution 55/255 on 31 May 2001; the treaty entered into force on 3 July 2005. It was signed by 52 parties and as of October 2022 it has 122 parties, including the European Union.

The states that have signed the protocol but have not yet ratified it are Australia, Canada, China, Iceland, Japan, Monaco, Seychelles, and United Kingdom. In February 2022, France (since February 2019) and Germany (since October 2021) are the sole among the top six arms exporting countries to have ratified the protocol. The other four – United States, Russia, China, and United Kingdom – have not.

Notes

External links
Protocol against the Illicit Manufacturing of and Trafficking in Firearms, Their Parts and Components and Ammunition, Supplementing the United Nations Convention against Transnational Organized Crime at the United Nations Office on Drugs and Crime (UNODC) website
United Nations Convention against Transnational Organized Crime and the Protocols Thereto, official website, unodc.org
Text, un.org.
Signatures and ratifications, un.org.

United Nations treaties
Protocol against the Illicit Manufacturing of and Trafficking in Firearms
Protocol against the Illicit Manufacturing of and Trafficking in Firearms
Protocol against the Illicit Manufacturing of and Trafficking in Firearms
Protocol against the Illicit Manufacturing of and Trafficking in Firearms
Treaties of Albania
Treaties of Algeria
Treaties of Angola
Treaties of Antigua and Barbuda
Treaties of Argentina
Treaties of Armenia
Treaties of Austria
Treaties of Azerbaijan
Treaties of the Bahamas
Treaties of Barbados
Treaties of Belarus
Treaties of Belgium
Treaties of Benin
Treaties of Bosnia and Herzegovina
Treaties of Brazil
Treaties of Bulgaria
Treaties of Burkina Faso
Treaties of Burundi
Treaties of Cambodia
Treaties of Cape Verde
Treaties of the Central African Republic
Treaties of Chile
Treaties of Costa Rica
Treaties of Ivory Coast
Treaties of Croatia
Treaties of Cuba
Treaties of Cyprus
Treaties of the Czech Republic
Treaties of the Democratic Republic of the Congo
Treaties of Denmark
Treaties of Dominica
Treaties of the Dominican Republic
Treaties of Ecuador
Treaties of El Salvador
Treaties of Estonia
Treaties of Ethiopia
Treaties of Finland
Treaties of France
Treaties of Gabon
Treaties of Ghana
Treaties of Greece
Treaties of Grenada
Treaties of Guatemala
Treaties of Guinea-Bissau
Treaties of Guyana
Treaties of Haiti
Treaties of Honduras
Treaties of Hungary
Treaties of India
Treaties of Iraq
Treaties of Italy
Treaties of Jamaica
Treaties of Kazakhstan
Treaties of Kenya
Treaties of Kuwait
Treaties of Laos
Treaties of Latvia
Treaties of Lebanon
Treaties of Lesotho
Treaties of Liberia
Treaties of the Libyan Arab Jamahiriya
Treaties of Liechtenstein
Treaties of Lithuania
Treaties of Luxembourg
Treaties of Madagascar
Treaties of Malawi
Treaties of Mali
Treaties of Mauritania
Treaties of Mauritius
Treaties of Mexico
Treaties of Mongolia
Treaties of Montenegro
Treaties of Morocco
Treaties of Mozambique
Treaties of Nauru
Treaties of the Netherlands
Treaties of Nicaragua
Treaties of Nigeria
Treaties of Norway
Treaties of Oman
Treaties of Panama
Treaties of Palau
Treaties of Paraguay
Treaties of Peru
Treaties of Poland
Treaties of Portugal
Treaties of Moldova
Treaties of Romania
Treaties of Rwanda
Treaties of São Tomé and Príncipe
Treaties of Saudi Arabia
Treaties of Senegal
Treaties of Serbia and Montenegro
Treaties of Sierra Leone
Treaties of Slovakia
Treaties of Slovenia
Treaties of South Africa
Treaties of South Korea
Treaties of Spain
Treaties of Saint Kitts and Nevis
Treaties of Saint Vincent and the Grenadines
Treaties of Sudan
Treaties of Eswatini
Treaties of Sweden
Treaties of Switzerland
Treaties of North Macedonia
Treaties of Togo
Treaties of Trinidad and Tobago
Treaties of Tunisia
Treaties of Turkey
Treaties of Turkmenistan
Treaties of Tanzania
Treaties of Uganda
Treaties of Ukraine
Treaties of Uruguay
Treaties of Venezuela
Treaties of Zambia
2001 in New York City
Treaties adopted by United Nations General Assembly resolutions
Treaties entered into by the European Union